William Prince (born 1986) is a Canadian folk and country singer-songwriter based in Winnipeg, Manitoba.

Life and career
A direct descendant of Chief Peguis, Prince was born in Selkirk, Manitoba in 1986, and moved with his family to Peguis First Nation as a boy. Prince's father was also a musician and preacher, who recorded a number of albums, and Prince travelled with his father playing gigs in northern Manitoba.

Prince released his solo debut album, Earthly Days, on December 11, 2015. The song "Breathless" reached #22 on the Billboard Adult Contemporary charts in 2018. Prince's sophomore album, Reliever, was released on February 7, 2020. In October 2020 Prince released his third studio album, an album of country gospel songs called Gospel First Nation.

Prince also performed alongside Vince Fontaine and Don Amero in the band Indian City.

His fourth album, Stand in the Joy, is slated for release April 14, 2023 on Six Shooter Records. It was preceded in February by the preview tracks "When You Miss Someone" and "Tanqueray".

Awards and accolades
Prince won the Western Canadian Music Award for Aboriginal Artist of the Year in 2016. He received a Canadian Folk Music Award nomination for Aboriginal Songwriter of the Year at the 12th Canadian Folk Music Awards. Prince won the Juno Award for Contemporary Roots Album of the Year at the Juno Awards of 2017 for his debut album Earthly Days and was a finalist for the Roots Album of the Year and Indigenous Music Album of the Year.

His song "The Spark" won the 2020 SOCAN Songwriting Prize.

His 2020 album Reliever received a nomination for Contemporary Roots Album of the Year at the Juno Awards of 2021. He won two Canadian Folk Music Awards at the 16th Canadian Folk Music Awards in 2021, for Contemporary Album of the Year and English Songwriter of the Year.

At the 2021 Juno ceremony, Prince and Serena Ryder performed "The Spark" at Toronto's Church of the Holy Trinity. In 2022, Prince and Ryder also released the standalone single "Sing Me a Song".

In 2022 he appeared at the Buffy Sainte-Marie tribute concert Buffy Sainte-Marie: Starwalker, performing both "Up Where We Belong" as a duet with Marie-Mai and "Now That the Buffalo's Gone" with the surviving members of The Tragically Hip.

Discography

Studio albums
 Earthly Days (2015)
 Reliever (2020)
 Gospel First Nation (2020)
 Stand in the Joy (2023)

Singles
 "7" (2016)
 "You Can't Judge a Book by the Cover" (2018)
 "Breathless (Acoustic)" (2018)
 "The Spark" (2019)
 "Always Have What We Had" (2020)

References

External links
 Official website
 

1986 births
Living people
21st-century First Nations people
21st-century Canadian male singers
Canadian country singer-songwriters
Canadian folk singer-songwriters
Canadian male singer-songwriters
First Nations musicians
Juno Award for Contemporary Roots Album of the Year winners
Musicians from Manitoba
People from Selkirk, Manitoba
Oji-Cree people
Glassnote Records artists
Canadian Folk Music Award winners